Ana Sol Escobar (born 5 November 1976), formerly known professionally as Anasol and now as Sol Escobar, is a Colombian singer.

Early life and education
Escobar was born in Buenos Aires, Argentina in 1976 to Colombian parents. She began formal dance instruction at the age of five. She spent most of her childhood in between, Colombia, Argentina, Spain and the U.S. In her teens she spent most of the time in Colombia but spent one year in Florida. She studied music at Universidad Javeriana of Bogotá. Colombia, with an emphasis in music production and sound engineering. She completed a diploma degree in screenwriting for cinema and television at Blackmaria.

Career
In 1999, Anasol released her debut album Escorpión de Primavera (Scorpion of Spring). The first single, "Pensando en Desorden", was a top 10 hit in Colombia.

Anasol's second studio album Astros was released in 2002 on Sony Music Colombia, produced by Luis Fernando Ochoa. The album was a success in Colombia, certified gold during its first week of sales and later certified platinum. Three singles were released from the album: "Sin Miedo A Caer" (August 2002), "Voy volando", and "Amantes Invisibles".

Anasol's self-titled third album, comprising 11 tracks and a bonus dance mix track of single "Sentimiento", was released in 2005.

Anasol has cited as her musical influences Everything but the Girl, Tori Amos, Madonna, Gustavo Cerati and Index ID.

Discography
Studio albums
Escorpión de Primavera (1999)
Astros (2002)
Anasol (2005)
La Dama Oscura (2018)

Singles
"Pensando en Desorden" (1999)
"Sin Miedo A Caer" (2002)
"Sentimiento" (2005) – Billboard Hot Latin Songs no. 31
"Nace" (2006)
"Disparo" (2018)
"Matria" (2022)

References

Colombian pop singers
21st-century Colombian women singers
People from Buenos Aires
Argentine people of Colombian descent
Argentine emigrants to Colombia
Living people
1976 births
Sony Music Latin artists
Universal Music Latin Entertainment artists